Black Mountain: An Exploration in Community is a 1972 book about Black Mountain College by Martin Duberman.

Bibliography

External links 

 

1972 non-fiction books
English-language books
Black Mountain College
E. P. Dutton books